USS Vixen may refer to the following ships of the United States Navy:

 , was a schooner, launched in 1803 and captured by the British in 1812
 , was a brig, purchased in 1813 and captured later that same year
 , was a steamship, purchased in 1846 and sold in 1855
 , was a gunboat, acquired in 1861 and decommissioned in 1862
 A monitor previously named  and later named USS Osceola was briefly named USS Vixen while in ordinary in 1869
 , was a yacht, built in 1896 and decommissioned in 1922
 USS Vixen (SP-68) was the name given briefly to a tender commissioned in August 1917 but renamed 
 , was a gunboat, commissioned in 1941 and decommissioned in 1946

United States Navy ship names